Oppenheimer is an upcoming biographical film written and directed by Christopher Nolan and starring Cillian Murphy as J. Robert Oppenheimer, the American theoretical physicist credited with being the "father of the atomic bomb" for his role in the Manhattan Project—the World War II undertaking that developed the first nuclear weapons. A co-production between the United Kingdom and the United States, the film is based on American Prometheus, a biography written by Kai Bird and Martin J. Sherwin. The supporting cast includes Emily Blunt, Robert Downey Jr., Matt Damon, Rami Malek, Florence Pugh, Benny Safdie, Michael Angarano, Josh Hartnett and Kenneth Branagh. It is a co-production between Universal Pictures, Syncopy Inc. and Atlas Entertainment, with Nolan producing the film alongside Emma Thomas and Charles Roven.

Nolan was announced to write and direct a biographical film about J. Robert Oppenheimer, set during World War II, with Universal Pictures being chosen as the distributor in September 2021. Much of the main cast signed on between September 2021 and April 2022. Pre-production was underway by January 2022, with filming beginning in late February 2022 and wrapped that May. It is filmed in a combination of IMAX 65mm and 65mm large-format film including, for the first time, sections in IMAX black and white analog photography. Like his previous works, Nolan extensively used practical effects and minimum computer generated imageries.

Oppenheimer is scheduled to be released globally on July 21, 2023, by Universal Pictures. It is Nolan's first film not to be distributed by Warner Bros. domestically or internationally since Memento (2000).

Premise 
The film follows the life of theoretical physicist J. Robert Oppenheimer, the director of the Los Alamos Laboratory during the Manhattan Project, and his contributions that led to the creation of the atomic bomb.

Cast

Production

Development 

In December 2020, Warner Bros. Pictures announced plans to give its 2021 films simultaneous releases in theaters and on HBO Max due to the impact of the COVID-19 pandemic on the film industry. Christopher Nolan, who had partnered with the studio on each one of his films starting with Insomnia (2002), expressed his disbelief with the decision. In January 2021, media reports mentioned the possibility that Nolan's next film could be the first to not be financed or distributed by Warner Bros. Nolan had previously supported the studio's decision to give Wonder Woman 1984 (2020) a simultaneous release, stating that he perceived this situation to have been handled properly, but said he had been excluded from any discussions regarding the postponed release of his film Tenet (2020).

In September 2021, it was announced that Nolan would write and direct a biographical film set during World War II about J. Robert Oppenheimer, creator of the atomic bomb, with Cillian Murphy in negotiations to star. Nolan approached multiple studios for the project, including Sony Pictures, Universal Pictures, Paramount Pictures, and Apple Studios due to his strained relationship with Warner Bros. According to insiders, Paramount was out of the selection early on in the wake of the replacement of CEO and Chairman Jim Gianopulos with Brian Robbins, an advocate for increased streaming service releases. On September 14, it was confirmed that Universal would distribute the film, with production set to begin in the first quarter of 2022. Some of Nolan's demands included a production budget of $100 million and an equal marketing budget, a theatrical window of at least 100 days, 20 percent of the film's first-dollar gross, and a three-week period before and after the film's release in which Universal could not release another new film.

Casting
Oppenheimer marks the sixth collaboration between Nolan and Murphy, and the first starring Murphy as the lead. To prepare for the role, the actor did what he summarized as "an awful lot of reading" on Oppenheimer's life. The casting process was so secretive that some of the actors did not know which role they were going to play until they signed on. Robert Downey Jr., Matt Damon, and Emily Blunt took pay cuts to work on the film, earning $4 million each in lieu of their usual $10–20 million salaries.

Filming

Pre-production was underway by January 2022 in New Mexico, where a two-day casting call took place in Santa Fe and Los Alamos for people to audition to play local residents, military personnel and scientists. Another casting call was held in February. Filming began in late February 2022, with Hoyte van Hoytema serving as cinematographer. In the second week of April, filming took place at the Institute for Advanced Study in Princeton, New Jersey. The film uses a combination of IMAX 65 mm and 65 mm large-format film. It is also the first film to shoot sections in IMAX black and white analog photography. Gary Oldman said he would be on set for a day in May for "one scene, a page and a half". Filming also occurred in California, primarily around the campus of the University of California, Berkeley. Filming wrapped after four months in May 2022. Filming involved the use of real explosives to recreate the Trinity nuclear test, forgoing the use of computer generated graphics.

Post-production
During post-production, editing will be completed by Jennifer Lame, and the musical score will be composed by Ludwig Göransson, who previously edited and scored Tenet, respectively. Visual effects were handled by DNEG, marking their eighth collaboration with Nolan. Andrew Jackson was the visual effects supervisor.

Release 
Oppenheimer is scheduled to be released theatrically on July 21, 2023, by Universal Pictures in IMAX 70mm, vertical 70 mm, and 35 mm. Considering the film's budget and marketing costs, Variety stated that the film will need to gross at least $400 million worldwide to make a profit.

Marketing

A teaser trailer was released in July 2022, featuring a live countdown to 5:29 AM (MST) on July 16, 2023, the 78th anniversary of the first detonation of an atomic weapon; it premiered in screenings of Nope before being posted online on Universal's social media profiles. Two more trailers premiered in front of Avatar: The Way of Water, one of which was exclusive to IMAX screenings.

See also
 List of black-and-white films produced since 1966

References

External links
 
 

2020s American films
2020s British films
2020s English-language films
2020s historical thriller films
2023 films
2023 thriller films
American historical thriller films
American war epic films
Atlas Entertainment films
British historical thriller films
British war epic films
Cultural depictions of J. Robert Oppenheimer
Epic films based on actual events
Films about the Manhattan Project
Films based on biographies
Films directed by Christopher Nolan
Films produced by Charles Roven
Films produced by Christopher Nolan
Films produced by Emma Thomas
Films scored by Ludwig Göransson
Films set in New Mexico
Films shot in California
Films shot in New Jersey
Films shot in New Mexico
Films with screenplays by Christopher Nolan
Syncopy Inc. films
Thriller films based on actual events
Universal Pictures films
Upcoming English-language films
Upcoming films